Mohamed Naser Elsayed Elneny (born 11 July 1992) is an Egyptian professional footballer who plays as a defensive midfielder for  club Arsenal and the Egypt national team.

Elneny began his senior career in the Egyptian Premier League, before moving to Swiss club Basel in January 2013. He won eight honours at Basel, including the Swiss Super League in each of his four seasons. In January 2016, he was transferred to Arsenal.

Elneny competed at the 2012 Summer Olympics for the Egyptian under-23 team, and played for the senior team at the 2017, 2019 and 2021 Africa Cup of Nations, as well as the 2018 FIFA World Cup.

Club career

Al Mokawloon
Elneny played his youth football with Al Ahly. In 2008, he transferred to Al Mokawloon during the 2010–2011 season. Elneny advanced and became a regular in the starting team. Following the Port Said Stadium disaster in early February 2012, the Egyptian Premier League was stopped and all subsequent matches of the 2011–12 Egyptian Premier League were postponed. On 10 March 2012, the Egyptian Football Association announced their decision to cancel the remainder of the season.

Basel

FC Basel had been watching Elneny for some time and invited him to their training camp in Estepona from 14 to 24 January 2013. Elneny played his unofficial debut on 18 January 2013 during the friendly match against Steaua București, a 1–1 draw. Elneny was able to impress Basel's trainer Murat Yakin during the training camp and on 29 January 2013, it was announced that he had signed a loan contract with Basel up until the end of June 2013. Elneny played his official debut for Basel in the 2012–13 Swiss Super League season on 10 February 2013 in the 3–0 home win against Sion as he was substituted in at half time.

At the end of the Swiss Super League season 2012–13 Elneny won the Championship title and was Swiss Cup runner up with Basel. In the 2012–13 UEFA Europa League Basel advanced as far as the semi-finals, there being matched against the reigning UEFA Champions League holders Chelsea, but they were knocked out, losing both home and away ties, beaten 2–5 on aggregate.

During May 2013 Basel announced that they had taken up the option of signing the Egyptian midfielder on a permanent basis. He signed a four-year contract up-until 30 June 2017. He scored his first goal for Basel, the last goal of the match, in the 4–2 home win at the St. Jakob-Park against Zurich on 16 April 2014. At the end of the 2013–14 Super League season Elneny won the league championship with Basel. They also reached the final of the 2013–14 Swiss Cup, but were beaten 2–0 by Zürich after extra time. During the 2013–14 Champions League season Basel reached the group stage and finished the group in third position. Thus they qualified for Europa League knockout phase and here they advanced as far as the quarter-finals. In their season 2013–14 Basel played a total of 68 matches (36 Swiss League fixtures, 6 Swiss Cup, 6 Champions League and 10 Europa League and 10 test matches). Elneny totaled 55 appearances, 32 League, 4 Cup, 6 Champions League and 6 Europa League as well 7 in the test games. He scored just that one goal in the league.

The season 2014–15 was a very successful one for Elneny and FC Basel. The championship was won for the sixth time in a row that season and in the 2014–15 Swiss Cup they reached the final. But for the third season in a row, they finished as runners-up, losing 0–3 to FC Sion in the final. Basel entered the Champions League in the group stage and reached the knockout phase as on 9 December 2014 they managed a 1–1 draw at Anfield against Liverpool. But then Basel then lost to Porto in the Round of 16. Basel played a total of 65 matches (36 Swiss League fixtures, 6 Swiss Cup, 8 Champions League and 15 test matches). Under manager Paulo Sousa Elneny totaled 51 appearances, 29 in the Super League, 6 in the Cup and 7 in the Champions League, as well 9 in test games. He scored 5 goals in these matches.

Despite the fact that Elneny left the club during the winter break, under their new trainer Urs Fischer Basel won the Swiss Super League championship at the end of the 2015–16 Super League season. For Elneny it was the fourth title, for the club it was the seventh in a row and their 19th championship title in total. During his time with the club, Elneny played a total of 169 games for Basel scoring a total of 13 goals. 91 of these games were in the Swiss Super League, 16 in the Swiss Cup, 37 in the UEFA competitions (Champions League and Europa League) and 25 were friendly games. He scored five goals in the domestic league, three in the cup, two in the Europa League and the other three were scored during the test games.

Arsenal

On 13 January 2016, after a 3–3 draw against Liverpool, Arsenal manager Arsène Wenger confirmed the signing of Elneny from FC Basel. The following day, the transfer was officially confirmed by the club for an undisclosed fee reported to be somewhere between £5 million and £7.4 million. He was assigned the number 35 shirt for Arsenal. He made his debut for the club in a 2–1 win against Burnley in the fourth round of the FA Cup on 30 January, becoming the first Egyptian ever to play for Arsenal. Elneny scored his first Arsenal goal in the Champions League Round of 16 second leg defeat against FC Barcelona, and was later awarded Arsenal's Player of the Month award for March. He also starred in April combining well with Aaron Ramsey, winning the Arsenal's Player of the Month award for a second month. Elneny's only goal won him the goal of the season award for Arsenal.
In the 2017–18 season, on 7 December 2017, Elneny scored his first goal at the Emirates Stadium (his second for Arsenal overall) in the Europa League Group Stage against FC BATE Borisov in a match which ended 6–0 to the home side. On 15 February, Elneny again produced a commendable display in the first leg of Arsenal's round of 32 Europa league tie against Östersunds FK. Elneny was subsequently rewarded man of the match for his effort in a 3–0 away victory.

On 26 March 2018, Elneny renewed his contract with Arsenal. On 8 April 2018, Elneny was sent off against Southampton. In a tight game defender Jack Stephens tussled with Jack Wilshere and retaliation from Stephens resulted in referee Andre Marriner giving him a straight red. Wilshere escaped with just a yellow card but in the aftermath, Elneny received a red card after a shove on future Arsenal teammate Cédric Soares, that was his first red card ever in his professional career. Arsenal held on to win 3–2.

Loan to Beşiktaş
On 31 August 2019, Elneny joined Beşiktaş J.K. on a season-long loan deal with an optional buyout clause. On 14 September, Elneny was sent off in his debut in a 3–2 defeat against Gazisehir Gaziantep in the Turkish Super Lig. On 25 July 2020, he scored his first and only goal for the club in a 3-0 victory over Genclerbirligi.

Return to Arsenal
On 28 August 2020, Elneny was in the starting 11 in the 2020 FA Community Shield, which Arsenal clinched a 5–4 victory over Liverpool in the penalty shootout after the match was 1–1 after 90 minutes. On 1 November 2020, Elneny put in an excellent display at the base of Arsenal's midfield alongside Thomas Partey to render Bruno Fernandes and Paul Pogba ineffective and earn Arsenal a first league win at Old Trafford since 2006. Elneny was praised by manager, Mikel Arteta after the game. While being away with Egypt during the International break in November 2020, it was confirmed by the Egyptian Football Association that Elneny tested positive for COVID-19 but showed no symptoms. After his return, he scored his first goal of the season in a 4–2 victory over Dundalk in the Europa League on 10 December 2020. His stunning strike outside the box was voted as the runner-up of the Goal of the Month on Arsenal's official website, also later on winning goal of the season. Elneny then scored another screamer versus Olympiacos on 11 March 2021, to keep Arsenal in the tie. On 2 May 2021, Elneny scored his first Premier League goal for Arsenal with a volley from the edge of the box in a game against Newcastle United.

On 24 May 2022, Elneny renewed his contract with Arsenal. On 21 February 2023, Elneny signed a new one-and-a-half-year deal with the club.

International career
Elneny helped the national under-23 team qualify for the 2012 Olympics, where he played in all four games as the team reached the last eight, and were knocked out by Japan.

Elneny made his full international debut in a 2–1 loss against Sierra Leone in September 2011. He scored his first goal for Egypt in a 2–2 draw against Jamaica in a friendly on 4 June 2014.

He was in the senior Egypt national squad for the Africa Cup of Nations 2017 in Gabon, where the nation finished as runners-up. He also helped the team qualify to the 2018 FIFA World Cup tournament in Russia, this is the third time for the Egyptians to participate in the competition after the 1934 and 1990 editions.

Media
Elneny was involved in the Amazon Original sports docuseries All or Nothing: Arsenal, which documented the club by spending time with the coaching staff and players behind the scenes both on and off the field throughout their 2021–22 season.

Personal life
Elneny is a devout Muslim.

In July 2019, the body of a man, believed to be a thief attempting to steal electrical cables, was discovered on Elneny's property in El-Mahalla El-Kubra, Egypt. The body was discovered by his father, who immediately reported the incident to the police. It is believed that the man was electrocuted trying to steal the cables.

On 15 May 2021, Arsenal's sponsors Lavazza commenced "urgent talks" with the club after Elneny posted a tweet in support of Palestine during the 2021 Israel–Palestine crisis. This resulted in a response from the Board of Deputies of British Jews.

Career statistics

Club

International

As of match played 18 November 2022. Egypt score listed first, score column indicates score after each Elneny goal.

Honours
Basel
Swiss Super League: 2012–13, 2013–14, 2014–15, 2015–16

Arsenal
FA Cup: 2016–17
FA Community Shield: 2017, 2020
EFL Cup runner-up: 2017–18
UEFA Europa League runner-up: 2018–19

Egypt
Africa Cup of Nations runner-up: 2017, 2021

Individual
Africa Cup of Nations Team of the Tournament: 2021

References

External links

Profile at the Arsenal F.C. website
Profile at the Premier League website
Profile at Swiss Football League Website

1992 births
Living people
People from El Mahalla El Kubra
Egyptian footballers
Egypt youth international footballers
Egypt international footballers
Association football midfielders
Al Mokawloon Al Arab SC players
FC Basel players
Arsenal F.C. players
Beşiktaş J.K. footballers
Egyptian Premier League players
Swiss Super League players
Premier League players
Süper Lig players
2017 Africa Cup of Nations players
2018 FIFA World Cup players
2019 Africa Cup of Nations players
2021 Africa Cup of Nations players
Olympic footballers of Egypt
Footballers at the 2012 Summer Olympics
Egyptian expatriate footballers
Expatriate footballers in England
Expatriate footballers in Switzerland
Expatriate footballers in Turkey
Egyptian expatriate sportspeople in England
Egyptian expatriate sportspeople in Switzerland
Egyptian expatriate sportspeople in Turkey
FA Cup Final players